Euryglottis albostigmata is a moth of the family Sphingidae first described by Walter Rothschild in 1895.

Distribution 
It is known from Colombia and Peru.

Description 
It is very different from other species in the genus Euryglottis, particularly in colour as well as the absence of a pale angle-shaped marking in submarginal area on the forewing upperside. The hindwing upperside of the females is more extensively white than in males.

Subspecies
Euryglottis albostigmata albostigmata (Colombia)
Euryglottis albostigmata basalis Rothschild & Jordan, 1906 (Peru)

References

Euryglottis
Moths described in 1895